Trent Rivers (born 30 July 2001) is an Australian rules footballer who plays for the Melbourne Demons in the Australian Football League (AFL). He was recruited by the Melbourne Demons with the 32nd draft pick in the 2019 AFL draft.

Early football
Rivers represented Western Australia at the AFL Under 18 Championships for two seasons, where he ended up winning under-18 All Australian selection. He also played for the East Fremantle Sharks for the 2019 season in the colts division.

AFL career
Rivers debuted in the Demons' one-point win over the Carlton Blues in the second round of the 2020 AFL season. He collected 12 disposals, 3 marks and 2 tackles. Rivers signed a contract extension in October 2020, keeping him at the club until 2023. Josh Mahoney, Melbourne's general manager of football, stated "Trent has already shown signs of what he’s capable of and we couldn’t have asked more from him this season. We look forward to his continued development over the next three years."

Rivers earned a Rising star nomination in round 11 of the 2021 AFL season, after collecting 19 disposals, seven intercepts and 326 metres gained.

Statistics
Updated to the end of the 2022 season.

|-
| 2020 ||  || 24
| 9 || 2 || 2 || 75 || 48 || 123 || 28 || 13 || 0.2 || 0.2 || 8.3 || 5.3 || 13.7 || 3.1 || 1.4
|-
| scope=row bgcolor=F0E68C | 2021# ||  || 24
| 25 || 1 || 1 || 241 || 137 || 378 || 101 || 39 || 0.0 || 0.0 || 9.6 || 5.5 || 15.1 || 4.0 || 1.6
|-
| 2022 ||  || 24
| 18 || 2 || 0 || 150 || 94 || 244 || 66 || 29 || 0.1 || 0.0 || 8.3 || 5.2 || 13.6 || 3.7 || 1.6
|- class=sortbottom
! colspan=3 | Career
! 52 !! 5 !! 3 !! 466 !! 279 !! 745 !! 195 !! 81 !! 0.1 !! 0.1 !! 9.0 !! 5.4 !! 14.3 !! 3.8 !! 1.6
|}

Honours and achievements
Team
 AFL premiership player: 2021
 McClelland Trophy: 2021

Individual
 22under22 team: 2021
 AFL Rising Star nominee: 2021 (Round 11)

References

External links

2001 births
Living people
Melbourne Football Club players
Australian rules footballers from Western Australia
East Fremantle Football Club players
Melbourne Football Club Premiership players
One-time VFL/AFL Premiership players